Ocotea benthamiana is a species of Ocotea in the plant family Lauraceae. It is an evergreen tree to 25–35 m tall.  Its conservation status is classed as vulnerable.

It is endemic to Ecuador, inhabiting the High Andes in the montane cloud forests, between 2,000 and 3,000 m. It can be found in countries like Peru, Ecuador, and Colombia.

References

benthamiana
Endemic flora of Ecuador
Flora of the Andes
Trees of Ecuador
Vulnerable flora of South America
Taxonomy articles created by Polbot